Gomesh Tappeh (also known as Gol Tappeh, Gomīsh Tappeh, and Qūsh Tepe) is a village in Karasf Rural District, in the Central District of Khodabandeh County, Zanjan Province, Iran. At the 2006 census, its population was 329, in 66 families.

References 

Populated places in Khodabandeh County